János Máté (born 19 May 1990) is a Hungarian football player. He plays for Tiszakécske FC. He played his first league match in 2009.

References

External links

1990 births
Living people
Sportspeople from Debrecen
Hungarian footballers
Association football forwards
Fehérvár FC players
Ferencvárosi TC footballers
BFC Siófok players
Szolnoki MÁV FC footballers
Nyíregyháza Spartacus FC players
Mezőkövesdi SE footballers
Gyirmót FC Győr players
Balmazújvárosi FC players
Csákvári TK players
Szeged-Csanád Grosics Akadémia footballers
Pécsi MFC players
Tiszakécske FC footballers
Nemzeti Bajnokság I players
Nemzeti Bajnokság II players